Association football is the most popular sport in Belgium, which has been played since the end of the 19th century. The national association was founded in 1895 with the intention of bringing some order and organization to the sport. The first match of the Belgium national team was played on 1 May 1904, a 3–3 draw against France.

Traditionally, the clubs Anderlecht, Club Brugge and Standard Liège are the three most dominant domestic teams, all of them also having played and/or won one or more UEFA competitions final(s).

National style 
Both the national football team and the top Belgium division have a reputation for physical play. This came as a result of a lack of technically skilled foreign players allowed to play in Belgium due to legal restrictions.  This changed after the Bosman ruling which forced the liberalization of the football player market in Europe.  In response, Belgian clubs began to buy unknown players from Eastern Europe, South America and Africa.  This had two contradictory consequences.  On the one hand, the national team was weakened by the reduced opportunity for native Belgium players to gain a spot on domestic teams.  On the other hand, the Jupiler League reinforced its status as an entry league for players who then move on to some of the greatest European clubs.

Indeed, some of the most talented players in Europe have played in Belgian clubs, including Yaya Touré, Jean-Pierre Papin, Daniel Amokachi, Antolín Alcaraz and David Rozehnal were discovered at Club Brugge; Sunday Oliseh and Victor Ikpeba at RFC Liège; Jan Koller, Nii Lamptey and Aruna Dindane at Anderlecht; and Mido at Gent.

Others who began or launched their professional careers in Belgium include William Carvalho, Emmanuel Eboué, Romaric, Gervinho, Didier Zokora, Arthur Boka, Ivica Dragutinović, Mario Stanić, Morten Olsen, Dorinel Munteanu, André Cruz, Seol Ki-hyeon, Kennet Andersson, Klas Ingesson, Aaron Mokoena, Michaël Ciani, Nicolás Pareja, Oguchi Onyewu, Rabiu Afolabi, Cheick Tioté, Peter Odemwingie, Joseph Yobo, Ouwo Moussa Maazou, Milan Jovanović, Ognjen Vukojević, Ivan Perišić, Nikica Jelavić, Demba Ba, Dante, Bryan Ruiz and Rob Rensenbrink.

Because of the physical nature of Belgian football, it has tended to primarily produce talented defensive players. These include Jean-Marie Pfaff, Eric Gerets, Leo Clijsters, Michel Preud'homme, Georges Grün, Philippe Albert, Franky Van Der Elst, Vincent Kompany and Thomas Vermaelen. In comparison, only few attacking Belgian footballers have received international recognition: Enzo Scifo, Jan Ceulemans, Marc Degryse, Luc Nilis and Émile Mpenza.

However, this latter trend is slowly starting to change, with Belgium producing such offensive talents as Romelu Lukaku, Eden Hazard, Mousa Dembélé, Christian Benteke, Kevin Mirallas, Marouane Fellaini, Kevin De Bruyne and Dries Mertens, among others.

Clubs

Matricule numbers 

With football's rapid growth in popularity in the late 19th century, several football clubs came into existence in Belgium. In 1926, the Royal Belgian Football Association decided to introduce matricule numbers to tell the clubs apart and assigned a matricule to each existing club by order of registration. In this manner, Antwerp was awarded matricule number 1 as the first to register. As such, the oldest clubs in Belgium typically have the lowest matricule numbers, although there are clubs which registered only years after their origination and as a result have a much higher matricule than would be expected. Many clubs, especially those with very low numbers, consider their matricule number part of their heritage and past and prominently feature it in their logo or even name. In case a club dissolves, the matricule number of this club is removed permanently and lost forever as numbers are never reused.

In case of mergers, the new club must decide which matricule number to keep, it normally begins the championship at the level where the former club with the same matricule number should have begun the season. Typically, mergers result in the most famous club's matricule being kept alive. However, it has often occurred that a club with a glorious past or even (multiple) championship titles had to merge with another less successful club in order to survive, often due to financial difficulties. In this case, the matricule number of the club, and the honours linked to it, were lost with the merger. As an examples, in the late 1990s, seven-time champion K. Beerschot VAC was struggling with financial difficulties in the third division and merged with then first division neighbour club KFC Germinal Ekeren to survive. The new club was named KFC Germinal Beerschot Antwerpen and started in the first division with the matricule number of KFC Germinal Ekeren, but lost the honours of K Beerschot VAC. The new club did keep playing in the Beerschot stadium and wore the purple shirt for which Beerschot was famously known. Another famous example is that of five-time champion Daring Club de Bruxelles' merger with RR White into R White Daring Molenbeek in 1973.

From the 2010s, matricules have been sold and traded, with clubs wanting to take over the position in a (higher) series of another club acquiring these matricules in order to quickly move up one or more divisions. Examples include BX Brussels, which acquired the matricule of Bleid-Gaume in 2013, with the intent to transform and move the club from Bleid to Brussels, over 200 kilometres away. The Royal Belgian Football Association therefore enforced a new rule in 2016, stating that after a takeover, a club cannot move more than 30 kilometres from its original location.

From 2017, the Belgian FA enforced another rule, which allows clubs to buy back their old defunct matricule, which was first done by Lyra (matricule 7776) who acquired the matricule 52 of the old defunct Lyra. In 2018, Oud-Heverlee Leuven, which is the result of a merger of three clubs around the city of Leuven, changed its matricule number 6142 back to number 18 to honour the glorious past of its eldest predecessor.

The first few matricule numbers are:
Royal Antwerp
Daring Club de Bruxelles (no longer active)
Club Brugge
RFC Liégeois
R. Léopold Uccle Forestoise
Racing Club de Bruxelles
K.A.A. Gent
R.C.S. Verviétois (no longer active)
R. Dolhain F.C.
R. Union Saint-Gilloise

Naming 
A Belgian club's name usually includes the name of the town where the club plays as well as a prefix and/or suffix.  Since Belgians speak three languages, French and Dutch being the main ones and German being the third official language, Belgian teams may use either language as the basis for their names. For historical reasons, many Flemish clubs changed their names from French to Dutch between the beginning of the 20th century and the late 1960s. Additionally, many clubs have experienced frequent name changes. Reasons for these include a language change, a merger, an anniversary, etc. Because of the numerous mergers between Belgian clubs, team names sometimes combine several town names (such as K. Beringen-Heusden-Zolder or Sporting West Ingelmunster-Harelbeke) which reflect mergers. In recent history, clubs representing immigrant communities have come into existence and sometimes use names that are in neither of Belgium's official languages (the now defunct clubs Türkgucun Ozburun and Türkiyemspor Zaventem, or the still-existing Agrupación Oviedo-Asturiana, existing only in a league outside the Belgian FA now, from Brussels, being examples).

Finally, a team which exists for at least 50 years may add the prefix "Royal" to its name (either in English or in the team's language). Before 1958, this right was given to any team that celebrated its 25th year of existence. Between 1958 and 1968, the rule was changed to grant the title to any team with at least 35 years of existence. Since 1968, the time limit has increased to 50 years.

The following is a partial list of common football club name prefixes and suffixes in Belgium's three official languages.

European results 
Anderlecht and KV Mechelen have won a European competition. Here is a list of the winners and runners-up by competition:

UEFA Champions League:
Final:
Club Brugge (1978)
UEFA Cup Winners' Cup:
Wins:
Anderlecht (1976 and 1978)
KV Mechelen (1988)
Finals:
Anderlecht (1977 and 1990)
Standard Liège (1982)
Royal Antwerp (1993)
UEFA Cup:
Wins:
Anderlecht (1983)
Finals:
Club Brugge (1976)
Anderlecht (1984)
Inter-Cities Fairs Cup:
Final:
Anderlecht (1970)
European Super Cup:
Wins:
Anderlecht (1976 and 1978)
KV Mechelen (1988)

Football in Belgium by province 
Under the first four levels in the league system, the competition is organized by the Provinces of Belgium, with the notable exception of the three entities that were created from the 1995 breakup of the former Province of BrabantFlemish Brabant, Walloon Brabant and the Brussels Capital Regionwhose clubs are split into two former Province of Brabant wide leagues, one Flemish-speaking and one French-speaking.

West Flanders 
As of the 2022–23 season, five clubs from the province of West Flanders play in the First Division A (Club Brugge, Cercle Brugge, KV Kortrijk, KV Oostende and SV Zulte-Waregem), and one clubs plays in the First Division B (Club NXT).

East Flanders 
As of the 2022–23 season, only one club from the province of East Flanders play in the First Division A (KAA Gent), but there are three clubs who plays in the First Division B (KMSK Deinze, FCV Dender EH and SK Beveren).

Antwerp 
Antwerp Province has a long tradition of football. The first Belgian clubs were established in the city of Antwerp (Antwerp Lyon's Club, A.S. Anvers-Borgerhout, and most notably Royal Antwerp, which is the country's oldest club and which is affectionately referred to as the "Great Old" by its supporters and the media).

Three clubs from this province currently play in the top flight: Royal Antwerp, KV Mechelen and K Beerschot VA while KVC Westerlo and Lierse Kempenzonen play in the First Division B.

Limburg 
Two clubs from Limburg Province currently play in the First Division A: KRC Genk and Sint-Truiden. Additionally, one club represents the province in First Division B: Lommel SK.

Brussels Capital Region
Technically-speaking, greater Brussels (the City of Brussels and surrounding communities) is not a province but rather an region akin to Flanders and Wallonia. Two currently active clubs from Brussels play in First Division A, Anderlecht, the country's most successful club to date, and Union Saint-Gilloise, 11 time champion of Belgium, which acquired place in Division A by winning the First Division B in 2020-21 season.

The first-ever Belgian League Championship was a competition amongst seven teams, four of which were based in Brussels: Racing Club, Léopold Club Uccle, Sporting Club and Union d'Ixelles. Léopold Club was a club for the nobility and bourgeoisie in Brussels and is still active after no less than four mergers between 1982 and 2001 (they are currently playing in the Fourth Division). The latter two clubs ceased to exist in 1897 and 1901 respectively and were replaced by a new Brussels-based club (Royale Union Saint-Gilloise), which would become a dominant force in Belgian football during the following seasons, winning seven titles between 1903 and 1913. The club originally shared a rivalry with Racing Club and later Daring Club, which would go on and win the title in 1912. Later, Anderlecht became their biggest rival for citywide bragging rights.

After World War I, Belgian football was dominated by clubs from the cities of Antwerp and Bruges. From the early 1930s, however, the Brussels-based clubs Union and Daring divided five titles between themselves. The rivalry between the two clubs has inspired a stage play named Bossemans et Coppenolle ("Bossemans" was the name of the Union head coach in those years, "Coppenolle" his counterpart at Daring). Shortly after World War II, Anderlecht replaced Union and Daring as the dominant team in Brussels. Its cross-city rivals at the time were, in succession, Union, Daring and Racing White, later renamed R.W.D.M., still later named FC Brussels. The latter were liquidated in 2014 and revived a year later as RWDM47. White Star Bruxelles, a club from the Brussels suburban region, technically won promotion to the top flight after the 2015-16 season but due to the club's debts, both the Belgian FA and the courts did not award them a licence to practice professional football. As a result, the club were relegated to the First Amateur Division and were ultimately wound up in October 2017.

Flemish Brabant 
Only one club from the province of Flemish Brabant is currently active in the top two divisions of Belgian football, Oud-Heverlee Leuven, playing in the First Division A.

Walloon Brabant 
After the 2018-19 season, AFC Tubize were relegation to the First Amateur Division and as a result, no club from the province of Walloon Brabant plays in the top two divisions of Belgian football in 2019-20.

Hainaut 
Two teams from Hainaut Province are currently playing in First Division A: Excel Mouscron and Charleroi SC.

Namur 
Namur Province is, along with that of Luxembourg, the province with the least prestigious football history in Belgium. Currently, no clubs from the province of Namur are playing in the top two levels of Belgian football. Furthermore, no club from this province has ever played in the top flight.

Liège 
Liège Province also has a long history in Belgian football. RFC Liège won the first-ever Belgian title in 1896. The club struggled financially during the early years of the 21st century and was eventually dissolved in 2011. A new club was formed, which is currently competing in the First Amateur Division.

Currently, two clubs from the province are competing in First Division A, Standard Liège and KAS Eupen. The latter is the only club from the German-speaking Community of Belgium (based on an administrative area in east of Liège Province) ever to have competed in the top flight. They first played at the top level in 2010–11 but were relegated after that season, before returning after the 2016–17 season. No team from the province is currently in the First Division B.

Historically, RFC Liège (five titles between 1895 and 1953) and Standard Liège (ten titles between 1958 and 2009) are the province's most successful, well-known and popular clubs.

Luxembourg 
Only one club from Luxembourg Province plays near the top level of Belgian football: Excelsior Virton, who won promotion to the First Division B after the 2018-19 season. No club from this province has ever played in the top flight. Former Belgian international Philippe Albert (Bouillon) and current international Thomas Meunier (Sainte-Ode) were born in the province.

League system 

As of the 2016–17 season, the Belgian football league pyramid has nine levels. The FA dramatically overhauled the league system after the 2015–16 season, reducing the number of professional teams to 24 and introducing a nationwide amateur league for the first time.

Nationwide leagues:

 First Division A (renamed from "Pro League" after the 2015–16 season)
 First Division B – replaced the former Second Division for 2016–17
 National Division 1 – introduced for 2016–17

Regional leagues:
 Division 2 (three leagues, two for Flemish clubs and one for Francophone clubs, with Flemish teams assigned loosely on geographic location)
 Division 3 (four leagues, two each for Flemish clubs and Francophone clubs, with all teams assigned loosely on geographic location)

Provincial leagues:
 Provincial Division 1
 Provincial Division 2
 Provincial Division 3
 Provincial Division 4 (except in Luxembourg and the Francophone Brabant league, where this level does not exist)

Each provincial subdivision of the FA runs its own 4-division league. Only teams that are geographically located in a certain province are allowed to compete in the corresponding provincial league. To include as well teams from the capital region of Brussels (which is not a province by itself and also does not belong to a province), teams from Brussels, Flemish Brabant and Walloon Brabant are split into two similar leagues based on their language. As a result there are two "provincial" leagues corresponding to the former Province of Brabant: one Brabant "provincial" league for Flemish clubs (including all Flemish clubs from Brussels, Flemish Brabant and Walloon Brabant) and a Brabant "provincial" league for Francophone clubs (including all Francophone clubs from Brussels, Flemish Brabant and Walloon Brabant). The majority of the clubs from the Brussels capital region are Francophone, de facto resulting in two provincial leagues roughly corresponding to Flemish Brabant on one hand; and Walloon Brabant and Brussels on the other hand.

European Competitions

International results by Belgian clubs 
Reaching quarter-finals onwards:

UEFA Champions League 
The following teams have qualified for the group stage in the UEFA Champions League:

Club Brugge (8 times: 1992–93, 2002–03, 2003–04, 2005–06, 2016–17, 2018–19, 2019–20, 2020–21)
Anderlecht (12 times: 1993–94, 1994–95, 2000–01, 2001–02, 2003–04, 2004–05, 2005–06, 2006–07, 2012–13, 2013–14, 2014–15, 2017–18)
Genk (3 times: 2002–03, 2011–12, 2019–20)
Lierse (1997–98)
Standard Liège (2009–10)
Gent (2015–16)

Football outside the Belgian FA 
Other than the UEFA-affiliated Royal Belgian Football Association, several amateur football leagues exist in Belgium, most at regional levels. These are often called "pub teams' leagues", although this is not entirely correct: far from all clubs represent a pub, as often there are teams enrolled who represent a town or district of a village, a company or another institution. Many amateur leagues exist in Belgium, most of them are region-bound or province-bound. Examples of amateur leagues with a long tradition include the KVV (Koninklijke Vlaamse Voetbalbond) organising provincial leagues in all Flemish provinces save for West-Vlaanderen; the MTSA for the area Dendermonde-Aalst-Denderstreek; the LVVB Melle for the area Wetteren-Ghent (with some clubs outside this area); the LVV Meetjesland for the Meetjesland area and few clubs from Ghent, the Corporative Leagues in several provinces mainly intended for company teams (although sometimes also including general amateur teams), the WALIVO in the Waasland area, the ABSSA and Travailliste leagues in Brussels and surrounding areas, … The system is complex as some of these regional leagues are affiliated to the Belgian FA (sometimes their member clubs receive a matricule number) but the leagues are totally separate from the league system in the leagues directly run by the Belgian FA (described above). Some other amateur leagues operate totally separate from the Belgian FA with no connection to the Belgian FA in any ways. Amateur leagues are in decline in some areas due to the competition from the general Belgian FA-run leagues and due to long travel distances being unpractical at amateur level. Several clubs who started in amateur leagues have made the transfer to the leagues run directly by the Belgian FA (starting at the lowest level). Some of these clubs even managed to, after a while, reach a relatively high level of the Belgian pyramid. Many amateur leagues in the past were tied to a political ideology, and Catholic, Socialist and Liberal amateur leagues existed. Nowadays most amateur leagues are based upon geographic area rather than on political ideologies.

Indoor football 

In Belgium, the Belgian FA also runs a nationwide Futsal league. Clubs are given a matricule number as well, although a separate one than the matricule numbers assigned to the clubs in outdoor football. Usually the letter A is in front of the matricule number to indicate an indoor club. A separate indoor football league is organised by the BZVB (Belgische Zaalvoetbal Bond, translated as Belgian Indoor Football Association), this is not tied to the Belgian FA. Both of these leagues run at the same moment but without any interaction with each other.

In addition, Mini Football is popular in Belgium (this has different rules all together than Futsal) and this league is run by a separate FA dealing with mini football only.

Women's football 

Both the Belgian FA and several regional amateur football leagues run a league for women. The league operated by the Belgian FA consists of three nationwide levels, with several levels per province below. The Belgian FA started to organise women's football in the early seventies, due to the UEFA obligating every member FA to organise leagues for women as well as for men. In the beginning the Belgian FA discouraged women to play football and advised them to opt for sports such as volleyball. The first season only existing clubs (with male teams) could enrol a female team in the league. As popularity of women's football grew and more and more teams wanted to play in the league, the Belgian FA dropped the above rule and accepted new clubs to affiliate who only focussed on ladies' football. These clubs are assigned matricule numbers just like any other club, and meanwhile women's football is fully integrated in the Belgian football structure. However, the league is not professional as yet (only a few female players have been full-time professionals) and the national team is amongst the weaker teams in Europe due to other countries such as Germany, Norway, Sweden having fully professional women's leagues. Clubs who have been successful in past or present in Belgian women's football include Brussels Dames '71 (currently the women's team of Anderlecht), Rapide Wezemaal, Astro Begijnendijk, Eva's Kumtich, Sinaai Girls, Standard Fémina Liège, Dames Eendracht Aalst (previously tied to the club KSC Eendracht Aalst which was also successful in men's football).

In the early 2010s, plans existed to develop a new super league where existing clubs with professional men's teams would enroll a women's team. Eventually, the Belgian and Dutch FAs launched a joint top-level league, the BeNe League, in 2012. Before the launch of this league, several famous clubs had created women's teams, such as Club Brugge, Lierse SK, Germinal Beerschot Antwerpen, and St-Truidense VV. After the 2014–15 season, the two countries chose to disband the BeNe League and relaunch their own national top flights; the Dutch revived their women's Eredivisie, while Belgium chose instead to create a totally new top flight, the Super League.

Largest Belgian football stadiums

See also
 List of football stadiums in Belgium

References

External links 

 RSSSF archive  – Belgian clubs history
  League321.com – Belgian Football League Tables, Records & Statistics Database.
 Belgian Soccer Database – Extensive database about players, clubs, results and other historical statistics